is a Japanese anime film and television director.

Works

Films
Legend of Toki (2008)
Detective Conan: Quarter of Silence (2011)
Detective Conan: The Eleventh Striker (2012)
Detective Conan: Private Eye in the Distant Sea (2013)
Detective Conan: Dimensional Sniper (2014)
Detective Conan: Sunflowers of Inferno (2015)
Detective Conan: The Darkest Nightmare (2016)
Detective Conan: Crimson Love Letter (2017)
Godzilla: Planet of the Monsters (2017)
Godzilla: City on the Edge of Battle (2018)
Godzilla: The Planet Eater (2018)
My Tyrano: Together, Forever (2018)
Monster Strike the Movie: Lucifer Zetsubō no Yoake  (2020)
The Journey (2021)
Lupin the Third vs. Cat's Eye (2023)

Television series
Samurai Girls (2010; credited under the pseudonym KOBUN)
Samurai Bride (2013; credited under the pseudonym KOBUN)
Knights of Sidonia (2014)-season 1
Soul Buster (2016)

OVAs
Mahō Sensei Negima!: Mō Hitotsu no Sekai (2009, episodes 1 and 2)

References

External links

Japanese film directors
Japanese television directors
Anime directors
Living people
1972 births